Grigory Alekseevich Rapota (born 5 February 1944) is a Russian politician who currently serves as a Senator from the executive authority of Kursk Oblast. Prior to his appointment, he was the special representative of the Russian president in the Volga Federal District between 2008 and 2011. Before that he was the special representative of the Russian president in the Southern Federal District (North Caucasus and southern European Russia).

He was state secretary of the Union State of Russia and Belarus between 2011 and 2021.

Biography 
Grigory Rapota was born in Moscow. His father was a serviceman and aviator. His mother was a teacher by education, but due to constant travels in the service of her husband she had to work not only in school, but also as a librarian, and in a savings bank.

He graduated from Bauman Moscow State Technical University in 1966 with a degree in engineering design, later graduated from the Krasnoznamenny Institute of the KGB of the USSR.

From 1966 to 1990 he worked in the First Main Directorate of the KGB (foreign intelligence), was on long missions in the US, Sweden and Finland, from 1990 to 1994 – deputy chief, head of the CCGT department.  From 1994 to 1998, he served as Deputy Director of the Foreign Intelligence Service of Russia, oversaw partnerships with foreign intelligence agencies.

From April to November 1998 – Deputy Secretary of the Security Council of Russia, from November 1998 to September 1999 – General Director of the state company Rosvooruzhenie.  From September 1999 to May 2000 – First Deputy Minister of Trade of Russia, engaged in military-technical cooperation.  From June 2000 to October 2001 – First Deputy Minister of Science, Industry and Technology.  From October 2001 to October 2007 – Secretary General of the Eurasian Economic Community.  As the general director of Rosoboronexport, he significantly influenced the contract for the supply of Tor-M1 systems to Greece, a member of NATO, which is estimated as a significant contribution to the fight against the American monopoly on the supply of arms in Europe.  Greece is the only NATO state in which the entire air defense system of the country and the armed forces consists only of Russian anti-aircraft and anti-missile defense complexes.

On 9 October 2007 he was appointed plenipotentiary representative of the President of the Russian Federation in the Southern Federal District, and from 14 May 2008 – Plenipotentiary Representative of the President of the Russian Federation in the Privolzhsky Federal District.  Until 2011, Rapota worked as Plenipotentiary of the President, violating the law of the Russian Federation (amendment on the maximum age of employees).).

References

1944 births
Living people
1st class Active State Councillors of the Russian Federation
Politicians from Moscow
KGB officers
Medvedev Administration personnel
Members of the Federation Council of Russia (after 2000)